The 2009 Molson Scotia Cup (Nova Scotia's men's provincial curling championship) was held February 10-15 at the Chester Curling Club in Chester, Nova Scotia. The winning team represented Nova Scotia at the 2009 Tim Hortons Brier in Calgary.

Teams

* Throws skip rocks

Draw Brackets

A Event

B Event

C Event

Results

Draw 1
February 11, 1000

Draw 2
February 11, 1500

Draw 3
February 12, 0830

Draw 4
February 12, 1230

Draw 5
February 12, 1630

Draw 6
February 12, 2030

Draw 7
February 13, 1000

Draw 8
February 13, 1500

Draw 9
February 13, 2000

Draw 10
February 14, 1000

Draw 11
February 14, 1500

Playoffs

A vs. B
February 14, 2000

C1 vs. C2
February 14, 2000

Semifinal
February 15, 1000

Final
February 15, 1500

External links
Nova Scotia Curling Association

Molson Scotia Cup, 2009